Mu Leonis (μ Leonis, abbreviated Mu Leo, μ Leo), also named Rasalas , is a star in the constellation of Leo. The apparent visual magnitude of this star is 3.88, which is bright enough to be seen with the naked eye. In 2014, an exoplanet was discovered to be orbiting the star.

Nomenclature
μ Leonis (Latinised to Mu Leonis) is the star's Bayer designation.

It bore the traditional names Rasalas and Alshemali, both abbreviations of Ras al Asad al Shamaliyy. In 2016, the International Astronomical Union organized a Working Group on Star Names (WGSN) to catalogue and standardize proper names for stars. The WGSN approved the name Rasalas for this star on 12 September 2016 and it is now so included in the List of IAU-approved Star Names.

Properties
The trailing notation indicates that, for a star of its type, it has stronger than normal absorption lines of cyanogen and calcium in its spectrum. It has around 1.5 times the Sun's mass, but has expanded to around 14 times the Sun's radius. Mu Leonis shines with 63 times the luminosity of the Sun from an outer atmosphere that has an effective temperature of 4,436 K. It is around 3.35 billion years old.

Planetary system

In 2014 it was announced that Mu Leonis has a planetary companion that is at least 2.4 times as massive as Jupiter and orbits with a period of 358 days. This planet was detected by measuring radial velocity variations caused by gravitational displacement from the orbiting body.

References

External links
 

K-type giants
CN stars
Planetary systems with one confirmed planet
Leo (constellation)
Leonis, Mu
Rasalas
Leonis, 24
048455
3905
085503
Durchmusterung objects